Chevaline may refer to:

 The Chevaline project, a former secret project to upgrade the British Polaris missile system
 Chevaline, a commune of the Haute-Savoie département, in France
 The Roan Antelope, known in French as Antilope Chevaline
 Chevaline is another name for horse meat for human consumption.